Highway 22A is a cross-border spur in the West Kootenay region of the province.  The highway was opened in 1967, and its number is derived from former Secondary State Highway 22A, with which the highway connected at the Canada–US border. Highway 22A connects Highway 3B east of Montrose to the border town of Waneta, 11 km (7 mi) south of the 3B junction.

References

022A